Gino Vannelli (born June 16, 1952) is a Canadian rock singer and songwriter who had several hit songs in the 1970s and 1980s. His best-known singles include "People Gotta Move" (1974), "I Just Wanna Stop" (1978), "Living Inside Myself" (1981) and "Wild Horses" (1987).

Career
Vannelli was born to an Italian family in Montreal, Quebec. His father, (Joseph) Russ Vannelli, sang with the Montreal dance bands of trumpeters Bix Belair and Maynard Ferguson.  His early ambition was to be a drummer. He admired Gene Krupa and Buddy Rich, and he played drums in a pop band while he was in high school. In 1969, at the age of seventeen, he signed a contract with RCA Records, using the name Vann Elli. He studied music theory at McGill University in Montreal.

Vannelli and his brother, Joe, moved to Los Angeles in 1972. Desperate and broke, they waited for hours in the parking lot outside A&M Studios, hoping to get a record deal. When Herb Alpert, the co-owner of A&M Records, finally emerged, Vannelli ran toward him and gave him a demo tape while being chased by security guards. Alpert signed Vannelli and released his debut album, Crazy Life, in the summer of 1973.

Vannelli was one of the first Caucasians (Dennis Coffey being the very first in January 1972) to appear on the television dance program Soul Train. In 1974, he was invited to tour with Stevie Wonder.

Vannelli released an album, Gist of the Gemini, in 1976 through A&M Records. His 1978 album Brother to Brother, also with A&M, produced the single "I Just Wanna Stop", which reached No. 4 on the Billboard magazine chart, No. 1 in Canada, and received a Grammy Award nomination. His next album, Nightwalker, also produced a top ten hit, "Living Inside Myself".

He received the Juno Awards for the most promising male vocalist of the year in 1975. In 1976, and again 1979, he received Juno Awards for the best male vocalist. He and his brother Joe, his musical partner during those years, shared the Juno for Best Production for Brother to Brother in 1979.

Despite the success of singles "Black Cars" and "Hurts to Be in Love" (1985), as well as "Wild Horses" (1987), after his 1979 world tour, Vannelli appeared live only sporadically throughout the 1980s.

Departing from the jazz-pop idiom, Vannelli released two largely-acoustic jazz discs, Yonder Tree (1995) and Slow Love (1997). Subsequent to producing the album Hitek Hiku for Danish jazz pianist Niels Lan Doky, Vannelli revisited his interest in western classical music with the song "Parole Per Mio Padre" (Words For My Father), dedicated to his late father, and composed in the style and tradition of Schubert. The recording came to the attention of Pope John Paul II who requested a performance of the song at the Vatican. Televised in Europe, the event caught the attention of the head of BMG Records who subsequently asked Vannelli to record a contemporary classical disc in the style of "Parole per Mio Padre". Canto, released by BMG in 2003, features songs sung in English, Italian, Spanish, and French (Tracklist: Canto, Parole Per Mio Padre, The Last Dance, Dea Speranza, Una Sola Voce, Wayward Lover, Mala Luna, Joli Cœur, Una Rosa A Dicembre, Il Viaggio, The Last Days Of Summer), as is considered by fans and Vannelli himself to be one of his strongest musical accomplishments. In 2008, Vannelli became a symbol of sorts for the National Basketball Association championship run by the Boston Celtics. After each blowout home victory during the 2008 season, the video crew at the TD Banknorth Garden played a clip from Dick Clark's American Bandstand that featured a bearded disco dancer clad in a tight Gino Vannelli T-shirt. The tradition became known in Boston as "Gino Time" and Gino T-shirts became common at Celtics games. The Wall Street Journal reported in 2008 that the dancer in the Gino shirt was a young man named Joseph R. Massoni, and that he died of pneumonia in 1990. He was 34 years old.

"People Gotta Move" became a small hit again in the Netherlands in 2008 after this song was used in a commercial on TV and radio of the ANWB (Dutch road assistance).

On May 13, 2014, Vannelli's Live in L.A. CD/DVD compilation was released by the Sono Recording Group. The presentation was recorded live onstage at the historic Saban Theater in Los Angeles on November 8, 2013, which represented Vannelli's first performance in Los Angeles in more than 15 years. The recording also marks the first on-stage collaboration in many years between the three Vannelli brothers (including Ross Vannelli as producer, editor, and mixer).

Vannelli resides in Troutdale, Oregon where he is active as a music teacher. He continues to perform throughout North America.

Awards and honors
 Grammy Award nomination, "I Just Wanna Stop", 1978
 Juno Award, Best Male Artist, 1976, 1979
 Juno Award, Recording Engineer of the Year, with Joe Vannelli, 1986, 1987, 1991

Discography

Albums

Singles

References

External links

 Official website
 
 
 Entry at thecanadianencyclopedia.ca
 Entry at 45cat.com as Vann-Elli
 Entry at 45cat.com

1952 births
Living people
20th-century Canadian male singers
21st-century Canadian male singers
A&M Records artists
Anglophone Quebec people
Arista Records artists
Ballad musicians
Canadian expatriate musicians in the United States
Canadian male singers
Canadian people of Italian descent
Canadian pop singers
Canadian rhythm and blues singers
Canadian rock singers
Canadian songwriters
Canadian soft rock musicians
Canadian soul singers
Jack Richardson Producer of the Year Award winners
Juno Award for Artist of the Year winners
Juno Award for Breakthrough Artist of the Year winners
Juno Award for Recording Engineer of the Year winners
McGill University School of Music alumni
Mercury Records artists
People from Troutdale, Oregon
Polydor Records artists
RCA Records artists
Singers from Montreal